Tramain Jones (born October 20, 1975 in Dallas, Texas) is a former American football defensive back who played most recently in the Arena Football League as a defensive specialist for the Tampa Bay Storm.

Junior College Career
Jones attended Trinity Valley Community College, and in 1994 as a sophomore he led his team to the NJCAA National football championship.

NCAA career
Jones attended Angelo State University for two years, where he won All-Conference honors twice, was named a first team All-Western Region and the Conference Defensive Back of the Year as a senior, and was named to two different All-America teams after his senior season.

AFL career
Jones had a 6-season career in the Arena Football League. He played for the Florida Bobcats (2000–2001), the Orlando Predators (2002), the Carolina Cobras (2003), the Tampa Bay Storm (2004–2006).

External links
National Junior College Championship winners
AFL stats

1975 births
Living people
People from Dallas
American football defensive backs
Angelo State Rams football players
Florida Bobcats players
Orlando Predators players
Carolina Cobras players
Tampa Bay Storm players